Some Great Reward is the fourth studio album by English electronic music band Depeche Mode, released on 24 September 1984 by Mute Records. The album peaked at number five in the United Kingdom and number 51 in the United States, and was supported by the Some Great Reward Tour. This also saw the band using samplers, much like they did in their previous album Construction Time Again, which they would continue to use in their following albums Black Celebration and Music For The Masses.

Additionally it also saw the band addressing more personal themes such as sexual politics ("Master and Servant"), adulterous relationships ("Lie to Me"), and arbitrary divine justice ("Blasphemous Rumours").
"Blasphemous Rumours" was released as a double A-side with "Somebody".

This was the first album where they achieved chart success in the US with the single 'People Are People' which reached No. 13 on the charts in mid-1985 on the Billboard Hot 100, and was a Top 20 hit in Canada. It was also the first album that peaked at a higher position on a chart that wasn't from the band's home country as it peaked at No. 1 in Germany.

Tour
The tour was the band's longest to date. A concert held at Alsterdorfer Sporthalle in Hamburg, West Germany, was recorded and issued as a video release titled The World We Live In and Live in Hamburg in 1985. The European release featured 16 songs, while the North American version featured 11 songs. The video has not yet seen a DVD release.

Book of Love was the opening band for all 15 tour dates of the North American leg of the tour.

Critical reception

Melody Makers Barry McIlheney hailed Some Great Reward and noted a "truly remarkable development" in Dave Gahan's voice, concluding that while "[i]t used to be okay to slag this bunch off because of their lack of soul, their supposed synthetic appeal, their reluctance to really pack a punch", the album "just trashes such bad old talk into the ground and demands that you now sit up and take notice of what is happening here, right under your nose".

New Musical Express critic David Quantick was critical of the sound of the record, and felt that it "suffers from too many missed grips on good ideas". He continues: "It ought to be an intelligent chart contender, a mix of commercial class and magpie manipulation of the unconventional; it isn't. When that bonk and clatter is used... it's just a nod to left-field, rather than use of the sound." Of the songs and singing he says: "Often the tunes are ordinary; Martin Gore, as ever, favours a bit of a drone. In small doses (singles) this is fine. Over 40 minutes, the interest begins to wane. Dave Gahan's voice has improved greatly – in that he's learned how to use its limited range – but like the melodies, it imparts mucho sameiness to the record." He concludes: "Depeche Mode can be one the few acts worthy of the name pop group. It's just that they should be so much better."

In Number One, Sunie expressed similar reservations: "The sadly under-rated Depeches turn out consistently excellent singles. But 45s rather than LPs remain their forte [...] They've progressed a million musical miles from their boppy origins, but Martin Gore's lyrics haven't kept up. Over a whole LP, their gaucheness is a major distraction from the record's musical merits."

Carole Linfield, in Sounds, felt the balance of powerful music and personal lyrics was just right: "The combination of the Depeche strength of vocal and now the Depeche delicacy is going to be hard to beat... This package is a carefully assorted, daintily arranged symphony ... one that carries emotion, devotion and yet never gives way to feebleness or predictability. OK... the lyrics look trite, often naïve and frequently clichéd when printed out [...] Yet Depeche have the right balance and necessary gauche to pull it off. Perhaps it's simply that power – never mawkish – that sustains it. Whichever way, the combination locks in. The Depeche Mode clicks."

German DJ Paul van Dyk cited Some Great Reward as his all-time favourite album, stating it is "one of the albums that really has influenced both myself and probably everyone who is somehow involved in electronic music."

Re-release
In 2006, Some Great Reward was re-released with a bonus DVD. The CD was remastered and was released on a CD/SACD hybrid. The bonus DVD includes the B-sides "In Your Memory" and "(Set Me Free) Remotivate Me" in addition to a remix of "Somebody" and several live versions of some of the songs from the album. The DVD also includes a documentary on the making of the album.

The remastered album was released on vinyl in March 2007.

Track listing

2006 Collectors Edition (CD + DVD)
Video

Audio

Personnel
Credits adapted from the liner notes of Some Great Reward.

Depeche Mode
 Martin Gore
 Alan Wilder
 David Gahan
 Andrew Fletcher

Technical
 Daniel Miller – production
 Depeche Mode – production
 Gareth Jones – production
 Ben Ward – engineering assistance
 Stefi Marcus – engineering assistance
 Colin McMahon – engineering assistance

Artwork
The artwork photo was taken by the Round Oak Steelworks in Brierley Hill, England. The Steelworks was demolished in 1984. Nowadays Merry Hill Shopping Centre is at the location.

 Brian Griffin – photography
 Stuart Graham – photography assistance
 Martyn Atkins – design
 David A. Jones – design
 Marcx – design

Charts

Weekly charts

Year-end charts

Certifications

References

External links
 
 Album information from the official Depeche Mode website
 Official remaster info

1984 albums
Albums produced by Daniel Miller (music producer)
Albums produced by Gareth Jones (music producer)
Depeche Mode albums
Mute Records albums
Sire Records albums
RCA Records albums
Virgin Records albums